Jethabhai's Stepwell or Jethabhai ni Vav, is a stepwell in Isanpur area of Ahmedabad, Gujarat, India. It was situated near sha e Alam and one of the heritage stepwells in Ahmedabad.

History and architecture

James Burgess wrote in 1905 in the Archaeological Survey of Western India, volume VIII,  "two and a half miles south of Ahmadabad, near Isanpur... [is] perhaps one of the most modern examples of the regular wav [step well]. It was constructed little more than forty years ago by the late Jethabhai Jivanlal Nagjibhai (or Mulji) of Ahmadabad. To obtain the materials, he purchased from the holder of Shah Alam the rauza belonging to a masjid known as that of Malik Alam...and from the late Qazi Hasan-ud-din of Ahmadabad he bought the Nenpurvada masjid at Rajapur-Hirpur together with its accompanying rauza. These were pulled down by the Hindu purchaser and the materials used in the construction of this well and in putting up a portico to his temple in the Shaherkotda suburb. In the ornamentation of the well one of the mihrabs of the mosque has evidently been utilized. It has the usual descents from platform or gallery to gallery."

The stepwell was built by Jethabhai around 1860s. It has four pavilions and the entrance pavilion is canopied.

The stepwell was restored by the Archaeological Survey of India in 2017–2018.

See also
 Dada Harir Stepwell
 Mata Bhavani's Stepwell
 Amritavarshini Vav
 Adalaj Stepwell
 Ahmedabad

References

Stepwells in Gujarat
Buildings and structures completed in the 18th century
Religious buildings and structures in Ahmedabad
Buildings and structures in Ahmedabad
Tourist attractions in Ahmedabad